Skjold may refer to:

Places
Skjold, Bergen, a neighborhood in Bergen municipality in Vestland county, Norway
Skjold, Rogaland, a village in Vindafjord municipality in Rogaland county, Norway
Skjold (municipality), a former municipality in Rogaland county, Norway
Skjold, Troms, a village in Målselv municipality in Troms og Finnmark county, Norway
Skjold (garrison), a Norwegian army garrison in Målselv municipality in Troms og Finnmark county, Norway

Other uses
Skjöld or Skjöldr, a king in Norse mythology
Skjold-class corvette, a Norwegian class of patrol boats
Skjold (ship), a Danish three mast barque built in 1839
BK Skjold, a Danish football team

See also
Skjold Church (disambiguation)
Skjoldungen, an island in Greenland